Azucena Berrutti (born 1929) is a Uruguayan politician and lawyer. She was the National Defence Minister, appointed by the Uruguayan President Tabaré Vázquez, from March 2005 until March 2008.

Defence Minister 2005–2008

At the age of 75, Berrutti, assumed the position of Minister of Defence in 2005, when Tabaré Vázquez became President of Uruguay. She was the first woman in this position.

In 2008 Berrutti was facing challenges by the Movement of Popular Participation (MPP) deputy Juan Domínguez, ostensibly a colleague in the ruling Frente Amplio coalition, and others in controversies surrounding defence procurement and the Nin brothers (Vice President of Uruguay Rodolfo Nin Novoa and his chief of staff Gonzalo Nin Novoa).

See also

 Politics of Uruguay

References

 :es:Azucena Berrutti

1929 births
Living people
University of the Republic (Uruguay) alumni
Uruguayan women lawyers
Uruguayan women jurists
Female defence ministers
Uruguayan people of Italian descent
Place of birth missing (living people)
Defence ministers of Uruguay
21st-century Uruguayan women politicians
21st-century Uruguayan politicians
Women government ministers of Uruguay